Katie Waissel (born 27 January 1986) is an English singer-songwriter who came into the public eye when she finished seventh in the seventh series of The X Factor. She is also known for being a housemate in Celebrity Big Brother 18, where she finished in eighth place.

Career

2008–10: Early career and Green Eyed World
In mid-to-late 2009, Waissel starred in an interactive, online reality show Green Eyed World, sponsored by Sprite.   The show focused on her journey in the US and Europe in hopes of a record label in 14 episodes of roughly 5 minutes in length each.  Sprite experimented with the world's first YouTube/Facebook digital connection.

During her time on the show, Waissel shot a music video for her song "Live and Learn", and released a five-track EP, Songs from Under the Covers under "KatieVRecords". A song recorded at the time, a duet with The Private Life of David Reed "Moving Mountains", later appeared on their self-titled album during her time on The X Factor under the alias "Lola Fontaine". Waissel has been on tour with East 17 and Andy Abraham Sometime after the show, Waissel performed in Hollywood for Paris Hilton together with friend and fellow contestant X Factor Storm Lee.

2010: The X Factor

Before auditioning for The X Factor, Waissel had worked as a receptionist, waitress and once worked at OK! magazine. At her audition, she wanted to sing "At Last" by Etta James, but Simon made her pick another song before she even started singing. Eventually, after forgetting the lyrics to We Are the Champions, she was allowed to sing her original song. She then sang At Last by Etta James, and was put through to bootcamp by Cheryl and Simon Cowell. At bootcamp, she sang "Make You Feel My Love" and reacted with shock when she was the first girl put through to the judges houses. She fell to pieces when performing the song "Smile" in front of Cheryl and will.i.am at the judges' houses stage, and had to stop to compose herself after crying, stating that "it's an emotional song for me".< Despite stumbling through her song for the second time, Cheryl picked her as one of her final three girls.

In week 1 of the live shows, she sang "We Are the Champions". She was put in the bottom three as a result of the public vote, but because Nicolo Festa polled the fewest votes, Waissel had to sing in the final showdown with F.Y.D., the other bottom three act from week 1. She sang "Don't Let Me Down" in the final showdown and was saved from elimination by the judges by a majority vote, with only Cowell (F.Y.D.'s mentor) voting against her while Cole, Dannii Minogue and Louis Walsh voted to save Waissel. Voting statistics revealed that F.Y.D. received more votes than Waissel meaning if Walsh sent the result to deadlock, F.Y.D. would’ve been saved. In the second week of the live shows, Katie sang "I'd Rather Go Blind". She managed to avoid the bottom three this week and secured a place to the third week, where she sang "I Wan'na Be Like You". In the fourth week she sang "Bewitched" and was in the final showdown with Belle Amie. The result went to deadlock this time, but Waissel was announced as safe when it was revealed that Belle Amie had the fewest votes. She was in the final showdown again the next week after performing "Don't Speak" but was saved by a majority vote over Treyc Cohen when Cole refused to vote against either acts of hers but wanted to vote last to send the result to deadlock but wasn't allowed to. Cowell and Walsh voted to eliminate Cohen and only Minogue voted to eliminate Waissel. Voting statistics revealed that Cohen received more votes than Waissel meaning if Cole was allowed to send the result to deadlock, Cohen would have been saved.

Waissel was in the final showdown for a third successive week when she sang "Saturday Night's Alright for Fighting", and this had been the fourth time Waissel had been in the final showdown. The result went to deadlock, but the public vote showed Aiden Grimshaw received fewer votes and he was eliminated. This was the first time in the show's history that a contestant was put into the final showdown four times and survived. In the quarter-final, she performed "Sex on Fire" and "Everybody Hurts". In the series' third double elimination, Waissel received the fewest votes and was automatically eliminated.

Waissel performed the following songs on The X Factor:

2011–13: Katie Waissel, Red Velvet and X Factor 2011 Live Tour
Shortly before her elimination, it was revealed Jay-Z had an interest in signing Waissel and fellow X Factor contestant Cher Lloyd to his label, Takeover Roc Nation. These plans did not materialise. On 17 March 2012 Waissel released her self-titled debut album on Chamberlain Records, which consists of recordings from her time on Green Eyed World. The song "The Ugly Truth" was used to promote the album – she performed the song on The Alan Titchmarsh Show, The Late Late Show, and embarked on a short shopping mall tour – although it was not released as a single. In June 2011, Waissel announced she was currently working on another album, and promised it would be a "dirty, sexy, rock 'n' roll" album. In July, she revealed her new band, called "Red Velvet Lovers", and according to Waissel are a "proper band".

In May 2013, Red Velvet released their first song for free download, entitled "I'm Fine", about Waissel's failed marriage to Alphonso, adding a message on her Twitter page thanking her fans for their support. Three more songs, "F*ck You", "High Fashion", and "Say It", were released for free download in June.

2016: Celebrity Big Brother
Katie Waissel competed in Celebrity Big Brother 18 in 2016. Fellow Housemate Christopher Biggins was removed after making a racist joke about the Holocaust towards Waissel, who is Jewish. She was evicted on Day 27, finishing in eighth place.

Other television appearances

Waissel made two appearances in Vanderpump Rules as herself in Series 4 Episode 1 at Scheana Shay's decade themed 30th birthday party, alongside Kristen Doute. Secondly in Episode 10, where it showed her in her real life role as an office manager of a tattoo removal company in Los Angeles.

Personal life
Waissel is Jewish. Her mother, Diane ( Vogel), is the daughter of Sheila Vogel-Coupe. In September 2012, Waissel married male model Brad Alphonso; they divorced after two months of marriage. In 2015, she married comedian Brian Moote; they split in late 2016. In July 2018, she gave birth to her first child, a boy named Hudson. In September 2018, she split from her boyfriend.

In 2021, Waissel won a scholarship and completed the postgraduate law course at BPP University. In January 2023, it was reported that she was trying to sue Syco Entertainment for breach of duty of care, and had founded the OWHL Foundation, a charity "overseeing welfare, human rights and liberty within the creative industry sector".

Discography

Albums

Extended plays

Studio Singles

As featured performer

Guest appearances

 a "Moving Mountains" was later also included on Waissel's self-titled album, as "Katie Waissel feat. David Reed".

Tours
2011: The X Factor Live Tour 2011

See also
List of The X Factor finalists (UK series 7)

References

1986 births
21st-century British musicians
Jewish singers
English Jews
English women singer-songwriters
Living people
The X Factor (British TV series) contestants
People from Harefield
English women pop singers
21st-century English women musicians
21st-century English women singers
21st-century English singers
Singers from London